Dani de la Orden (born 2 June 1989) is a Spanish film and television director.

Biography 
Dani de la Orden was born on 2 June 1989 in Barcelona. An avid consumer of cinema since he was very young, he started making short films alongside his grandmother. He earned a degree in direction from the ESCAC. Shortly after graduating he directed his debut feature, Barcelona Summer Night (2013), which sparked off a sequel, Barcelona Christmas Night (2015). They were followed by the mainstream comedies El pregón and The Best Summer of my Life.

A prolific film director, he had already shot 8 feature films—all comedies—at age 32. A recurring theme in his films is male immaturity. He has also directed episodes of television series Boca Norte and Elite. He published his first novel, Darse un tiempo (y otras mentiras), in 2021.

Director 
Feature films

Television 
 Since 2018 — Élite (Elite)
 2019 — Boca Norte

References 

1989 births
Film directors from Catalonia
Spanish film directors
Spanish television directors
Living people